Solbråtan Station is a railway station at Solbråtan in Oppegård, Norway. Located on the Østfold Line, it is served by the Oslo Commuter Rail line L2 operated by Vy with two hourly services. The station was opened in 1939.

External links
 

Railway stations in Oppegård
Railway stations on the Østfold Line
Railway stations opened in 1939
1939 establishments in Norway